Douglas Robert Stinson (born 1956 in Guelph, Ontario) is a Canadian mathematician and cryptographer, currently a Professor Emeritus at the University of Waterloo.

Stinson received his B.Math from the University of Waterloo in 1978, his M.Sc. from Ohio State University in 1980, and his Ph.D. from the University of Waterloo in 1981. He was at the University of Manitoba from 1981 to 1989, and the University of Nebraska-Lincoln from 1990 to 1998. In 2011 he was named as a Fellow of the Royal Society of Canada.

Stinson is the author of over 300 research publications as well as the mathematics-based cryptography textbook Cryptography: Theory and Practice.

Selected publications

See also
 List of University of Waterloo people

References

External links
 Doug Stinson's home page

Living people
1956 births
People from Guelph
Canadian mathematicians
Canadian computer scientists
Combinatorialists
Modern cryptographers
University of Waterloo alumni
Ohio State University alumni
Academic staff of the University of Waterloo